The dwarf vireo (Vireo nelsoni) is a species of bird in the family Vireonidae. It is endemic to Mexico.

Its natural habitat is subtropical or tropical high-altitude shrubland.

References

Vireo (genus)
Endemic birds of Mexico
Birds of Mexico
Natural history of the Mexican Plateau
Birds described in 1936
Taxa named by James Bond (ornithologist)
Taxonomy articles created by Polbot